Frontier Marshal is a 1939 American Western film directed by Allan Dwan and starring Randolph Scott as Wyatt Earp. The film is the second produced by Sol M. Wurtzel based on Stuart N. Lake's biography of Earp Wyatt Earp: Frontier Marshal (later found to be largely fictionalized). An earlier version was Wurtzel's Frontier Marshal, filmed in 1934. The film was remade by John Ford in 1946 as My Darling Clementine, including whole scenes reshot from the 1939 film.

Frontier Marshal costars Nancy Kelly, Cesar Romero as "Doc Halliday" (the name was changed for the film from the original "Holliday" because of fear of a lawsuit from Holliday's family), John Carradine and Lon Chaney, Jr. Ward Bond appears as the town marshal; Bond was also in the 1934 version, and later appears as Morgan Earp in Ford's film. Eddie Foy, Jr. plays the large supporting role of his father, entertainer Eddie Foy, in this as well as three other feature films.

Plot 

In Tombstone, Arizona, the sheriff is unwilling to stop Indian Charlie from shooting up the saloon owned by Ben Carter, so new arrival Wyatt Earp does. Earp is beaten by some of Carter's hired men for taking the law into his own hands.

Dance hall girl Jerry is upset with Earp, so when her sweetheart Doc Halliday gets to town, a showdown seems imminent. Earp and Doc instead become friends. Earp takes over as the lawman in town and also tries to convince Doc's former sweetheart Sarah Allen that their relationship can still work out.

The two men work together after visiting entertainer Eddie Foy is kidnapped, and also when Jerry joins forces with Carter to plan the robbery of a gold shipment. Doc is forced to perform surgery to save a life, then is shot in the back by Carter. Earp avenges his friend's death and Jerry leaves.

Cast 

 Randolph Scott as Wyatt Earp
 Nancy Kelly as Sarah Allen
 Cesar Romero as Doc Halliday
 Binnie Barnes as Jerry
 John Carradine as Ben Carter
 Edward Norris as Dan Blackmore
 Eddie Foy Jr. as Eddie Foy
 Ward Bond as Town Marshal
 Lon Chaney Jr. as Pringle 
 Chris-Pin Martin as Pete
 Joe Sawyer as Curley Bill 
 Dell Henderson as Dave Hall 
 Harry Hayden as Mayor Henderson
 Ventura Ybarra as Pablo
 Charles Stevens as Indian Charlie
 Tom Tyler as Buck Newton (uncredited)

Origins 

The film was based on Stuart Lake's book Wyatt Earp: Frontier Marshal, published two years after Earp's death in 1929. Prior to his death, Earp and his wife Josephine ("Sadie") went to great lengths to keep Josephine's name out of the book, and she threatened litigation to prevent her name from being used in the film. In 1934, she had successfully forced the producers to excise her husband's name from the first film. In 1939, she sued 20th Century Fox for $50,000 to prevent it from producing the remake of Frontier Marshal. After agreeing to remove Wyatt Earp's name from the title and settling with Josephine Earp for $5,000, Fox released the film as Frontier Marshal.

In Los Angeles, Josephine Earp befriended many celebrities, including Cecil B. DeMille and Gary Cooper. She received part of the money earned by sales of Lake's book about her husband as well as royalties from the film.

References

External links 

 
 
 
 

1939 films
1939 Western (genre) films
American Western (genre) films
American black-and-white films
Films directed by Allan Dwan
Films scored by David Raksin
20th Century Fox films
Cultural depictions of Wyatt Earp
Cultural depictions of Doc Holliday
Films scored by Samuel Kaylin
Films set in Tombstone, Arizona
1930s English-language films
1930s American films